River Street Bridge may refer to:

River Street Bridge (Iowa Falls, Iowa), listed on the National Register of Historic Places (NRHP)
River Street Bridge (Marble Rock, Iowa), listed on the NRHP
River Street Bridge (Charles River), Cambridge and Allston, Massachusetts